Ursula Bürger is a German former professional racing cyclist. She won the German National Road Race Championship in 1972.

References

External links

Year of birth missing (living people)
Living people
German female cyclists
Place of birth missing (living people)